Alizé Cornet and Vania King were the defending champions; however, King decided not to participate.
Cornet plays alongside Anna-Lena Grönefeld but were eliminated in the quarterfinals.

No.4 seeds Akgul Amanmuradova and Chuang Chia-jung defeated No.2 seeds Natalie Grandin and Vladimíra Uhlířová in the final 6–4, 5–7, [10–2] to win the title.

Seeds

Draw

Draw

References
 Main Draw

2011 WTA Tour
2011,Doubles
2011 in French tennis